The Eurovision Song Contest 2012 was the 57th edition of the Eurovision Song Contest. It was the first time Azerbaijan hosted the contestonly four years after the country made its debut. Organised by the European Broadcasting Union (EBU) and host broadcaster İctimai Television (İTV), the contest was held at the Baku Crystal Hall, and consisted of two semi-finals on 22 and 24 May, and a final on 26 May 2012. The three live shows were presented by Azerbaijani television presenter Leyla Aliyeva, newsreader Nargiz Birk-Petersen and singer Eldar Gasimov, the latter of whom was one of the previous edition's winners.

Forty-two countries participated in the contest.  returned to the contest for the first time since . Meanwhile,  withdrew due to security concerns in relation to the ongoing Nagorno-Karabakh conflict with Azerbaijan.  also did not participate due to financial concerns.

Out of the "Big Five" countries, Germany, Italy and Spain all managed to rank within the top 10, finishing eighth, ninth and tenth, respectively.

The lead-up to the contest was met with political concerns and protests surrounding the host country, including its human rights record and allegations by advocacy groups that Baku was carrying out forced evictions in the construction of the contest's venue, along with objections to the contest's presence by Iranian officialswho felt that the event was anti-Islamic because it was, according to them, a "gay parade".

Location 

Azerbaijan got the right to host the 2012 edition of the Eurovision Song Contest after winning the previous 2011 edition with the song "Running Scared" performed by Ell and Nikki. Baku, the capital and largest city of Azerbaijan, as well as the largest city on the Caspian Sea and of the Caucasus region, was named the host city for the contest, with the venue being the Baku Crystal Hall, built a few months prior to the contest on the city's coastline.

Shortly after Azerbaijan's victory at the 2011 edition, officials announced that a new 23,000-seat concert venue was to be built near National Flag Square in Baku, as a potential venue for the event. Three days later, other venue options were revealed by organisers, such as the 37,000-seat Tofiq Bahramov Stadium and the Heydar Aliyev Sports and Exhibition Complex. On 2 August 2011, Alpine Bau Deutschland AG was awarded the contract to construct the Baku Crystal Hall. Preparations for construction began in the area shortly after the announcement. Even though the full cost of the contract was not named, the government allocated 6 million AZN for the construction of the venue.

On 8 September 2011, Azad Azerbaijan TV (ATV) reported that Baku Crystal Hall would be the venue of the contest, but no formal confirmation was made at the time by the EBU. On 31 October 2011, Ismayil Omarov, the director general of Azerbaijani national broadcaster İctimai Television announced that a decision on the venue choice would be taken by the steering committee in January 2012. On 25 January 2012, it was confirmed that the Baku Crystal Hall would be the venue of the contest. Even though the venue had an extended capacity of 23,000 people, only 16,000 people were able to attend each show. Tickets for the contest became available online for purchase on 28 February 2012.

Format 

In a meeting of the Eurovision Reference Group on 29 June 2011, it was decided that the televoting system would revert the format used most recently in the 2009 contest, in which the phone and SMS lines opened for a fifteen-minute window after all songs had been performed, instead of opening before the show starts, which was the system used between 2010 and 2011. The results format of each show remained the same with each country's votes being decided on a 50:50 split between televoting and a national jury. Each participating country had their own national jury, which consisted of five professional members of the music industry.

Under the official rules released on 24 November 2011, the number of participants in the grand final was raised to 26, including the host nation, the "Big Five", and the ten qualifiers from each semi-final.  This was the second time in the Eurovision Song Contest that 26 countries were in the grand final, the first being the 2003 contest.

Semi-final allocation draw 

The draw that determined the semi-final running order was held on 25 January 2012 at the Buta Palace. The participating countries, excluding the automatic finalists (Azerbaijan, France, Germany, Italy, Spain and the United Kingdom), were split into six pots, based upon how those countries voted in past contests. From these pots, half (or as close to half as possible) competed in the first semi-final on 22 May 2012. The other half in that particular pot competed in the second semi-final on 24 May 2012. This draw also acted as an approximate running order, in order for the delegations from the countries to know when their rehearsals would commence and determine which semi-final the automatic finalists would be allowed to vote in.

Graphic design 

The design of the contest was built around the motto "Light Your Fire!", inspired by the nickname of Azerbaijan itself, "Land of Fire".

Each introductory video postcard began with a shot of the artist and performers, followed with the flag and country name in a handwritten font with a background resembling the yellow, orange and red fire of the 2012 theme art. The postcards consisted of various shots of Azerbaijan, with a caption displaying 'Azerbaijan' and underneath 'Land of ...' (e.g. Land of Abundance; Land of Poetry etc.), which were then followed by the name of a town or geographic feature, showing the landscape and culture of the country. Some postcards focused on the host city of Baku with text changing to 'Baku' and underneath 'City of ...' (e.g. City of Jazz; City of Leisure etc.). The postcards finished with a shot of the Crystal Hall displayed in the colours of the performing country's flag.  These postcards acted as a tourism mechanism to present the country to a wider audience.

The artist, song and number graphics as well as tables and voting graphics were kept the same as those used in 2011, with a slight modification to incorporate the 2012 theme art. The lower points (1-7) were highlighted in red squares while the top points (8, 10, 12) were highlighted in orange squares with each square increasing in size in relation to the point value. Both sets of graphics were designed by London brand design agency Turquoise Branding.

National host broadcaster 
İctimai Television (İTV), which was the EBU member that broadcast the Eurovision Song Contest in Azerbaijan, is one of country's public-service broadcasters. Deputy Minister of Communication and Information Technology of Azerbaijan, Iltimas Mammadov, stated that telecom networks were ready to host the event. Azerbaijan's largest telecommunications operator, Azercell, was chosen as the presenting partner for the contest. On 1 December 2011, İTV named the German production company Brainpool as its official production partner for the contest, citing the quality of its work on the previous year's contest.

Participating countries 

On 17 January 2012, the EBU announced that initially forty-three countries would take part in the 2012 contest. The 57th edition saw the return of Montenegro, who was last represented by Andrea Demirović in 2009. Poland decided not to participate, due to the financial burden of the UEFA Euro 2012 (which Poland co-hosted with Ukraine) and the 2012 Summer Olympics. Armenia, who had originally planned to participate, later withdrew their application due to security concerns related to the ongoing Nagorno-Karabakh conflict with Azerbaijan, subsequently reducing the number of participating countries to 42.

Returning artists 
Four artists returned in this year's contest. Kaliopi for Macedonia who previously participated in the 1996 contest with the song "Samo ti", which placed in 26th position in the pre-qualifying round. Kaliopi would then go on to represent Macedonia once more at the Eurovision Song Contest 2016.

Jónsi for Iceland and Željko Joksimović for Serbia both previously participated in 2004.
Joksimović had represented Serbia and Montenegro in 2004 with the song "Lane moje" which placed second in that year, and co-hosted the 2008 contest with Jovana Janković. 
Jónsi performed "Heaven" in 2004, which placed 19th.

For a second consecutive year Jedward participated for Ireland, after their 8th-place finish at the 2011 contest with the song "Lipstick".

Martina Majerle, who represented Slovenia in 2009, returned as a backing vocalist for Slovenia.

Lys Assia, the winner of the first Eurovision Song Contest in 1956, had entered her song "C'était ma vie" written by Ralph Siegel and Jean Paul Cara into the Swiss national selection for the 2012 contest. The song, however, only came eighth in a closely fought national selection. Assia attended the event in Baku as a guest of honour.

Languages 
The Finnish entry, "När jag blundar", sung by Pernilla Karlsson, was only Finland's second entry in Swedish (after "Fri?" by Beat in 1990) and the first entry at all to be sung in Swedish since 1998. Russia's entry, "Party for Everybody", sung by Buranovskiye Babushki, was the first entry ever to be performed in Udmurt. The Georgian entry, "I'm a Joker" was the first Eurovision entry containing the Georgian language while the Bulgarian song "Love Unlimited" had a few words in the Azerbaijani language, both of whom never appeared at the contest before.

Semi-final 1 
Azerbaijan, Italy and Spain voted in the first semi-final. The EBU allowed the Albanian broadcaster Radio Televizioni Shqiptar (RTSH) to defer transmission and only use jury votes due to the Qafa e Vishës bus accident.

Semi-final 2 
France, Germany and the United Kingdom voted in the second semi-final. Germany requested that they vote in this semi-final. Before it withdrew, Armenia was drawn to perform in the first half of this semi-final.

Final

Detailed voting results 

The EBU and PwC audit company checked and verified the individual jury and televoting results, which were combined to create the overall national vote for the contests. On 18 June 2012, the EBU published the following results.

Semi-final 1

12 points 
Below is a summary of the maximum 12 points each country awarded to another in the first semi-final:

Semi-final 2

12 points 
Below is a summary of the maximum 12 points each country awarded to another in the second semi-final:

Final

12 points 
Below is a summary of the maximum 12 points each country awarded to another in the grand final:

Spokespersons 
The order in which each country announced their vote was determined in a draw following the jury results from the final dress rehearsal. Similar to the 2011 contest an algorithm was used to add as much excitement as possible. The spokespersons are shown alongside each country.

 Andri Xhahu
 Marija Marković
 Paula Seling
 Kati Bellowitsch
 Oleksiy Matias
 Dmitry Koldun
 Peter Van de Veire
 Safura Alizadeh
 Keith Demicoli
 Monica Fabbri
 Amaury Vassili
 Scott Mills
 
 Adriana Magania
 Elvir Laković Laka
 Olivia Fortuna
 Anna Angelova
 Sara Hildebrand
 Lorella Flego
 Loucas Hamatsos
 Nevena Rendeli
 
 Kristina Talevska
 Vivienne van den Assem
 Joana Teles
 Matthías Matthíasson
 Sarah Dawn Finer 
 Nadia Hasnaoui
 Ignas Krupavičius
 Getter Jaani
 
 Valters Frīdenbergs
 Elena S. Sánchez
 Mr Lordi
 Sopho Toroshelidze
 
 
 Anke Engelke
 Oxana Fedorova
 Éva Novodomszky
 
 Gráinne Seoige

Other countries 

 On 19 October 2011, Andorra announced that there are no plans for the country to participate in 2012 due to financial difficulties; the country also had planned to withdraw from the EBU entirely.
 On 7 March 2012, the EBU announced that Armenian Public Television (ARMTV) had decided to withdraw from participation despite originally being included in the list of participating countries. Its decision came after President Ilham Aliyev of Azerbaijan gave a speech on 28 February 2012 when he stated "Our main enemies are Armenians of the world and the hypocritical and corrupt politicians under their control." The country was consequently fined by the EBU and were expected to face further penalties, such as exclusion from participation in future contests if it failed to comply with the EBU requirements. Armenia had been in a continuous state of war with Azerbaijan since the early 1990s due to the Nagorno-Karabakh conflict.
 On 24 November 2011, it was reported that the Czech Republic would not compete at the 2012 contest, following the release of a television schedule by Česká televize (ČT).
 On 26 November 2011, it was announced that two official EBU documents, published in March and October 2011, showed Liechtenstein's only national broadcaster 1FLTV as being granted active EBU membership, sparking speculations of a début for the nation. However, on 29 November 2011, these documents were later confirmed as editing mistakes, and thus a début had yet to be planned.
 On 31 December 2011, RTL Luxembourg confirmed that Luxembourg would not participate at the Eurovision in Baku.
 It had been reported on 23 November 2011, at an EBU meeting in Geneva, that Monaco were considering a return to the 2012 contest. However, on 3 December 2011, Phil Bosco, a former head of delegation told a French-speaking website that the Monegasque national broadcaster Télé Monte Carlo (TMC) did not intend to return to the Eurovision Song Contest any time in the near future, as there were no financial budget available.
 In an interview with the French delegation it had been revealed that Morocco were "likely to return" to the Eurovision Song Contest in 2012 with a new broadcaster 2M TV. Reports about the proposed return of Morocco to the contest, after an absence of more than 30 years, were further enhanced at an EBU meeting in Geneva. But ultimately the country did not end up participating.
 On 16 December 2011, it had been reported on the official Facebook page of Telewizja Polska (TVP) that Poland were not returning for the 2012 contest. This was confirmed a few days later, stating that the broadcaster had decided to focus on the 2012 UEFA European Football Championship (which Poland co-hosted with Ukraine) and Summer Olympics. TVP stated that a return in 2013 has not been ruled out.

Broadcasts 

Most countries sent commentators to Baku or commentated from their own country, in order to add insight to the participants and, if necessary, the provision of voting information.

Incidents

Human rights concerns
Azerbaijan's large investment in hosting the Eurovision contest was widely discussed in Western media as an attempt to "mitigate misgivings about its poor democracy and human rights record". Elnur Majidli, an activist imprisoned during the Arab Spring-inspired 2011 Azerbaijani protests, was released in an apparent effort to soften Azerbaijan's image ahead of the contest, but many political prisoners remained. Human Rights Watch reported a "violent crackdown on protesters" on the eve of the contest, and Amnesty International condemned the "stern crackdown of freedom of expression, dissent, non-governmental organizations (NGOs), critical journalists, in fact anyone who criticised the Aliyev regime too strongly" that continued up to the contest.

Human Rights Watch also criticised the Azerbaijani government and the Baku City Authority for carrying out forced evictions against local residents, in order to allow for the demolition of flats to make way for construction in the neighbourhood where the Baku Crystal Hall was built. The Public Association for Assistance to Free Economy, a transparency and economic rights campaign group, had described the evictions as a "violation of human rights", and as having "no legal authority". However, in a statement to the BBC, the EBU said that on a recent visit to Baku they had observed "that the construction of the concert hall [which] media reports refer to was already well under way on a clean construction site and thus there are no demolitions needed". The EBU cited the "apolitical" nature of the contest and the Azerbaijani government's claim that the construction was not tied to the contest.

The contest's eventual winner Loreen met local human rights activists during the event weeks, the only entrant to do so. She later told reporters, "Human rights are violated in Azerbaijan every day. One should not be silent about such things." An Azerbaijan government spokesman criticized her in response, saying that the contest should not "be politicised" and requested the EBU prevented further meetings of a similar nature. Swedish diplomats replied that the EBU, the Swedish broadcaster SVT and Loreen had not acted against the competition's rules.

On 26 May, a flash mob of anti-government protesters were quickly dispersed by police. Activists expressed fears that they would face a crackdown when the international spotlight left Azerbaijan again at the end of the contest. Before presenting the results of the German vote, the German spokesperson Anke Engelke gave a live statement that alluded to the human rights issues in Azerbaijan, saying: "Tonight nobody could vote for their own country. But it is good to be able to vote. And it is good to have a choice. Good luck on your journey, Azerbaijan. Europe is watching you."

Tensions with Iran 
Iranian officials objected to Azerbaijan hosting the contest, with Iranian clerics Ayatollah Mohammad Mojtahed Shabestari and Ayatollah Ja'far Sobhani condemning Azerbaijan for "anti-Islamic behaviour", while also claiming that Azerbaijan was hosting a gay parade. This led to protests in front of Iranian embassy in Baku, where protesters carried slogans mocking the Iranian leaders. Ali Hasanov, head of the public and political issues department in Azerbaijani president's administration, said that gay parade claims were untrue, and advised Iran not to meddle in Azerbaijan's internal affairs. In response, Iran recalled its ambassador from Baku, while Azerbaijan demanded a formal apology from Iran for its statements in connection with Baku's hosting of the contest, and later also recalled its ambassador from Iran.

On 30 May, the Ministry of National Security of Azerbaijan announced that they had thwarted a series of planned terror attacks against the contest, among the targets being Baku Crystal Hall, as well as Marriott and Hilton hotels in Baku. On 22 August, The Daily Telegraph reported that according to Western intelligence services, Iran's Supreme Leader Ali Khamenei personally gave orders to the elite Quds Force unit to launch terrorist attacks against the West and its allies, including Azerbaijan during the contest.

Other awards 
In addition to the main winner's trophy, the Marcel Bezençon Awards and the Barbara Dex Award were contested during the 2012 Eurovision Song Contest. The OGAE, "General Organisation of Eurovision Fans" voting poll also took place before the contest.

Marcel Bezençon Awards 
The Marcel Bezençon Awards, organised since 2002 by Sweden's then-Head of Delegation and 1992 representative Christer Björkman, and 1984 winner Richard Herrey, honours songs in the contest's final. The awards are divided into three categories: Artistic Award, Composers Award, and Press Award.

OGAE 
OGAE, an organisation of over forty Eurovision Song Contest fan clubs across Europe and beyond, conducts an annual voting poll first held in 2002 as the Marcel Bezençon Fan Award. After all votes were cast, the top-ranked entry in the 2012 poll was also the winner of the contest, "Euphoria" performed by Loreen; the top five results are shown below.

Barbara Dex Award
The Barbara Dex Award is a humorous fan award given to the worst dressed artist each year. Named after Belgium's representative who came last in the 1993 contest, wearing her self-designed dress, the award was handed by the fansite House of Eurovision from 1997 to 2016 and is being carried out by the fansite songfestival.be since 2017.

Official album

Eurovision Song Contest: Baku 2012 was a compilation album put together by the European Broadcasting Union, and released by Universal Music Group on 4 May 2012. The album featured all 42 songs that entered in the 2012 contest, including the semi-finalists that failed to qualify into the grand final.

Charts

See also 
 ABU Radio Song Festival 2012
 ABU TV Song Festival 2012
 Junior Eurovision Song Contest 2012

Notes

References

External links 

 
2012
2012 in Azerbaijan
Music in Baku
2010s in Baku
2012 song contests
May 2012 events in Asia
Events in Baku
May 2012 events in Europe